Jonathan Hammond is an American film director, film editor, screenwriter and film producer known for Expect A Miracle: Finding Light in the Darkness of a Pandemic, Isabel, Kathy and We All Die Alone.

Early life and career

A grant recipient from National Endowment for the Arts, Hammond grew up in Decatur, Illinois. He studied at University of Illinois and New York University Tisch School of the Arts before relocating to San Diego and later to Los Angeles. Hammond has cited influences from the works of Steven Spielberg, Alfonso Cuarón, Quentin Tarantino, and Taika Waititi. His film Expect A Miracle depicts San Diego's handle on AIDS in the 1980s, a time where sexual orientation towards the same gender was confined. Hammond was a panelist at San Diego Comic-Con and compared being selected to screen his film Kathy there as exciting as having an Emmy nomination. He was a judge for the Minneapolis 48 Hour Film Project in 2020 and his film Before depicted a dinner party within the COVID-19 Pandemic. Hammond and Jodi Cilley talked about the challenges faced when recruiting talent when turning true local stories into films. Film Threat praised Hammond's film We All Die Alone, scoring it 8 out of 10. Hammond is part of an expanded network of LGBT filmmakers who have influence to project styles of horror.

Filmography

Accolades

References

External links

Living people
Year of birth missing (living people)
American film directors
American film editors
21st-century American screenwriters
American film producers
University of Illinois Urbana-Champaign alumni
Tisch School of the Arts alumni
Film directors from California
Film directors from Illinois
Film directors from New York City
Screenwriters from California
Screenwriters from Illinois
Screenwriters from New York (state)
Film producers from California
Film producers from Illinois
Film producers from New York (state)
Comedy film directors
LGBT film directors
Film directors from Los Angeles
LGBT people from California
LGBT people from New York (state)
LGBT people from Illinois
LGBT producers
American LGBT screenwriters
20th-century LGBT people
21st-century LGBT people
People from Decatur, Illinois